Maarten de Wit (30 May 1883 in Wormerveer – 30 March 1955 in Zaandam) was a sailor from the Netherlands who represented his native country at the 1928 Summer Olympics in Amsterdam. De Wit, as crew member on the Dutch 8 Metre Hollandia, took the 2nd place with helmsman Johannes van Hoolwerff and fellow crew members: Lambertus Doedes, Cornelis van Staveren, Henk Kersken and Gerard de Vries Lentsch.

De Wit was the son of Simon de Wit (1852–1934), founder of the Simon de Wit supermarket chain, of which Maarten was a director. His son, Simon de Wit (1912–1976), who was CEO from 1943 to 1964, was a successful sailor and rower as well and was Chef d'équipe of the Dutch Olympic Sailing Team in 1952, 1956 and 1960 as well as Chef de Mission of the Dutch Olympic team at the 1964 Summer Olympics.

Sources

References

1883 births
1955 deaths
20th-century Dutch businesspeople
Dutch male sailors (sport)
Medalists at the 1928 Summer Olympics
Olympic sailors of the Netherlands
Olympic medalists in sailing
Olympic silver medalists for the Netherlands
People from Zaanstad 
Sailors at the 1928 Summer Olympics – 8 Metre
Sportspeople from Zaanstad